The Tien Shan shrew (Sorex asper) is a species of mammal in the family Soricidae. It is found in China and Kazakhstan.

References

Sorex
Taxonomy articles created by Polbot
Mammals described in 1914
Taxa named by Oldfield Thomas